The MB-2 Tow Tractor is an aircraft towing vehicle used by the United States and Allied Air Forces.

The first generation was delivered in 1968 to the US Air Force by the Oshkosh Truck Corporation.  Oshkosh delivered a total of 72 vehicles under that contract.  Since then, several manufacturer's have produced the MB-2 vehicle, including Stewart & Stevenson, Grove Corporation, and FMC Technologies(now JBT AeroTech).  The Air Force also purchases remanufactured MB-2 tow tractors.

See also 
M2 High Speed Tractor
Omni Directional Vehicle
U-30 Tow Tractor

Aircraft ground handling
Oshkosh vehicles